Whammy can refer to:

 A whammy, a serious setback, such as one caused by a spell, curse or hex.
 Double or triple whammy, an extra powerful whammy, a term popularized by the Li'l Abner character Evil-Eye Fleegle
 The villain of the game show Press Your Luck, designed by Savage Steve Holland
 Whammy! The All-New Press Your Luck, the 2002-03 US version
 Whammy! Push Your Luck, the Philippine version
 Whammy! - A 1983 album by The B-52's
 A whammy bar, a colloquial term for a guitar's tremolo arm
 Digitech Whammy, effect pedal
 A curse put on the opposing team by Dancing Harry
 The catchphrase of Champ Kind, a character in the movie Anchorman: The Legend of Ron Burgundy
 "Whammy", a song by Sharon Needles from the album Taxidermy